Sing Pao Daily News is a Hong Kong-based Chinese language newspaper.

Sing Pao may also refer to:

 Sing Tao Daily, also known as Sing Tao Jih Pao, a Hong Kong newspaper
 Sing Tao Wan Pao, a defunct evening edition of Sing Tao Daily; see Sing Tao Holdings
 Sing Sian Yer Pao, a Thai Chinese-language newspaper
 Sing Thai Wan Pao, a defunct evening edition of Sing Sian Yer Pao

See also
 Sin Poh (disambiguation)
 Star News (disambiguation)